is a Japanese football player, currently playing as a designated special player for FC Tokyo.

Career statistics

Club
.

Notes

References

External links

2000 births
Living people
Association football people from Saitama Prefecture
Juntendo University alumni
Japanese footballers
J3 League players
J1 League players
FC Tokyo players
FC Tokyo U-23 players
Association football midfielders